The Loyola Ramblers men's soccer team represents Loyola University Chicago in the Atlantic 10 Conference of NCAA Division I soccer. The Ramblers play their home matches at Loyola Soccer Park in the Rogers Park neighborhood of Chicago.

Record by year

References

External links